This is a list of titles in the Indian Amar Chitra Katha comic book series. The table below shows the numbering as part of the old series as well as that of the new series. Titles which were published in only one of the series have been indicated with a "NA" against the series in which they did not appear. The old series runs from #11 to #436 and the new series starts from #501. New series issues typically appear in a deluxe format and are usually reprints of titles in old series. However some issues such as Kalpana Chawla, JRD Tata etc. have appeared in the new series alone. Similarly, although most of the old series have reappeared in the new series, certain issues such as Napoleon Bonaparte, Louis Pasteur etc. are present in old series alone.

Three extra-long special issues were also published and numbered from 10001 onwards – Valmiki's Ramayana, Dasha Avatar and Jesus Christ. Few other special issues issued as part of the new series such as Tulsidas Ramayana, Mahabharata, Bhagawat Purana and Mahatma Gandhi are not numbered but are considered as part of the official title list of Amar Chitra Katha.

As of May 2014 Amar Chitra Katha have released 465 titles (454 individual issues and 11 special issues). Amar Chitra Katha also issues a collection of individual comics as a set of "3 in one" or "5 in one".

List of Amar Chitra Katha individual issues 

Key
 NA denotes that the comic is Not Available in that series.
 BS denotes that the comic has been published as part of a Bounded Set ( 3 in 1 (or) 5 in 1)
 BS' denotes that the comic has been published as part of a Bounded Set ( Coffee Table Books )
 SI denotes that the comic has appeared as part of a Special Issue/Bumper Issue which was a compilation of multiple issues together
 Issue 801 was originally Tales Of Ganesha and was later released as 830 Ganesha and the Moon.
 Issue 418 wasn't reprinted but released online as issue 476.  
https://books.google.com/books?id=Wf_cDgAAQBAJ&printsec=frontcover&source=gbs_ge_summary_r&cad=0
 Issue 276 released in 1986 has original name as Animal Tales from Arunachal Pradesh but reprinted in 2014, given a new serial number 772 and a new title - The Pig and the Dog.
 Issue 679 (Swami Pranavandana) and 847 (Jagjivan Ram) were never published and distributed for general public. Only available in their aashrams. Recently (September 2020), Swami Pranavanadana is digitalised and made available on ACK's official platform.
https://digital.amarchitrakatha.com/id006959024/Swami-Pranavananda

List of Amar Chitra Katha special issues

List of Amar Chitra Katha issues #1 to #10 
Amar Chitra Katha issues ranging from #1 to #10 were reproductions of western fairy tales. They were never published in English but were published in Kannada first and then the following Indian languages-Hindi, Marathi, Gujarati, Bengali, Tamil, Telugu, Malayalam

References 

Amar Chitra Katha list